Cratylus (Kratylos) was an ancient Athenian philosopher from the mid-late 5th century BCE, known mostly through his portrayal in Plato's dialogue Cratylus.  He was a radical proponent of Heraclitean philosophy and influenced the young Plato.

Life
Little is known of Cratylus beyond his status as a disciple of Heraclitus of Ephesus, Asia Minor.  Modern biographers have not reached consensus on his approximate date of birth, arguing alternately for an age comparable either to Plato or Socrates. Cratylus is mentioned in Aristotle's Metaphysics in a passage which seems to imply that he was an established and active philosopher in Athens during the mid-late 5th century, and that Plato was briefly interested in his teachings prior to aligning with Socrates.

Philosophy
In Cratylus' eponymous Platonic dialogue, the character of Socrates states Heraclitus' claim that one cannot step twice into the same stream.  According to Aristotle, Cratylus went a step beyond his master's doctrine and proclaimed that it cannot even be done once.

Influence
The contemporary philosophy Cratylism is based on a reconstructed version of Cratylus' theories of flux and language as they appear in Plato's dialogue.  It has been influential to Eastern thinkers, including Buddhist semioticians.  The Australian poet, academic, and literary critic Professor A. D. Hope published in 1979 a book of essays on poetry titled The New Cratylus..

Cratylus is mentioned twice in Emmanuel Levinas's 1961 book, Totality And Infinity.

See also
 List of speakers in Plato's dialogues

References

Ancient Greek philosophers of language
Greek non-fiction writers
5th-century BC Athenians
5th-century BC philosophers
Heraclitus
Skeptics
Year of birth unknown
Year of death unknown
Dialogues of Plato